is a retired judoka.

Yamaguchi won the All-Japan Judo Championships 10 consecutive times from 1978–1987 (twice in the -50 kg division, seven times in the -52 kg division) and won her first medal at the 1980 World Judo Championships. She went on to win 4 silver medals and one gold medal at the World Judo Championships. She also won a bronze medal in the -52 kg division at the 1988 Summer Olympics in Seoul, where women's judo was held as a demonstration sport. She retired from competitive judo in 1989 when she graduated from the University of Tsukuba. She worked as an instructor for the University of Tsukuba and Musashi University since retiring.　Yamaguchi is currently Associate professor of Tsukuba.

She is the model for the protagonist in Naoki Urasawa's judo manga, Yawara! A Fashionable Judo Girl, and makes a cameo appearance in the film version of the manga as well.

See also
 List of judoka
 List of Olympic medalists in judo

References

External links
 

1964 births
Academic staff of the University of Tsukuba
Living people
Japanese female judoka
Judoka at the 1988 Summer Olympics
Olympic judoka of Japan
People from Tokyo
20th-century Japanese women